Céline d'Orgeville is a Professor and instrument scientist at the Australian National University Research School of Astronomy and Astrophysics. She leads teams designing laser and optical systems for ground based astronomical telescopes. She is a Fellow of SPIE and the Astronomical Society of Australia.

Early life and education 
d'Orgeville was an undergraduate and master's student at Paris-Sud University. She spent her summer holidays as an intern in optical engineering. In 1997 d'Orgeville moved to Joseph Fourier University, where she worked on non-linear optics and laser-pumped oscillators.

Research and career 
d'Orgeville studies laser guide star adaptive optics, a technique that uses deformable mirrors and lasers to mitigate for atmospheric blur in images acquired by ground-based telescopes. From 1999 d'Orgeville worked for the Gemini Observatory, which operates the Gemini North and Gemini South astronomical telescopes in Hawaii and Chile respectively. She led the design, fabrication and commissioning of the laser guide star facilities of both telescopes. The laser systems developed by d'Orgeville include the Gemini South Multi-Conjugate Adaptive Optics, a near-infrared adaptive optics camera capable of capturing near diffraction-limited images from outer space.

In 2012 d'Orgeville moved to Australia. She was awarded an Australian National University Translational Fellowship to commercialise sodium guide star lasers. Here she has worked on the laser tomography adaptive optics systems for the Giant Magellan Telescope.

Academic service 
Since 2014, d'Orgeville has sat on the management committee of the Australian National University Gender Institute. She worked alongside SPIE on various gender equality initiatives, including collecting demographic data and surveying the adaptive optics community. She was awarded the SPIE Diversity Outreach award in 2021. She is a Fellow of SPIE and the Astronomical Society of Australia.

Selected publications

Personal life 
d'Orgeville has a husband and two children  and performs in an exceptional local choir.

References 

Living people
Year of birth missing (living people)
Academic staff of the Australian National University
21st-century French astronomers